The Stuntmen is a one-hour documentary for Australian TV written and directed by Brian Trenchard-Smith.

It won Best Documentary at the 1973 Australian Film Awards.

It was through this film that Trenchard-Smith met Grant Page, who he put under a five-year contract and featured in a number of films. The film also acted as a "calling card" which enabled the director to get finance for The Man from Hong Kong (1975).

References

External links

Australian documentary television films
1973 television films
1973 films
Films directed by Brian Trenchard-Smith
1970s English-language films